The Sunday Observance Act 1625 (1 Car 1 c 1) was an Act of the Parliament of England.

The Act banned participation in such activities as "bearbaiting, bullbaiting, Interludes, common Plays, and other unlawful exercises and pastimes" on Sundays. It was originally only to continue in force until the next session of Parliament.

The words of commencement, the words from "to the constables or churchwardens" to "shall be committed" and the words from "and in default of such distress" to "space of three hours" were repealed by section 1 of, and Schedule 1 to, the Statute Law Revision Act 1948.

The words "the same to be employed and converted to the use of the poor of the parish where such offence shall be committed" were repealed by section 46(2) of, and Part III of Schedule 7 to, the Justices of the Peace Act 1949.

Section 3 of, and Schedule 3 to, the Statute Law Revision Act 1958 provided that the Sunday Observance Act 1625 was to cease to have effect in so far as it entitled persons to plead the general issue in civil proceedings, and that accordingly the words from "and that if any man" to "evidence" were repealed.

The second proviso was repealed by section 87 of, and Schedule 5 to, the Ecclesiastical Jurisdiction Measure 1963 (No 1).

The whole Act, so far as unrepealed, was repealed by section 1 of, and Part IV of the Schedule to, the Statute Law (Repeals) Act 1969.

References
Halsbury's Statutes,

External links
Wording of Act

Acts of the Parliament of England
1625 in law
1625 in England
Sunday